Benjamin Broomhall (15 August 1829 – 29 May 1911) was a British advocate of foreign missions, administrator of the China Inland Mission, and author. Broomhall served as the General Secretary of the China Inland Mission (CIM), (from 1878 to 1895).  A boyhood friend of James Hudson Taylor (Founder and General Director of the China Inland Mission), he became husband to Hudson Taylor’s sister Amelia.  As General Secretary of the CIM, he was involved in fund-raising and recruiting missionaries to send to China and acted as editor of the mission magazine, "China's Millions".

Life
Born in Bradley Staffordshire, Broomhall was the eldest child of Charles and Jane Broomhall. Benjamin and his wife Amelia married in 1859 and were members of the Baptist Westbourne Grove Church in Bayswater, London, where they lived. It was pastored by their friend, William Garrett Lewis, who was instrumental to Hudson Taylor publishing "China's Spiritual Need and Claims". The Broomhalls did not go to China themselves, but they sent five of their ten children to China as missionaries, including Marshall Broomhall, the author of many books on China and missionaries; Albert Hudson Broomhall, the Treasurer of the CIM in China from 1918 to 1934; and Amelia Gertrude Broomhall, who married Dixon Edward Hoste, recruited by her father as part of the Cambridge Seven. (Dixon Hoste replaced Hudson Taylor as General Director of the CIM in 1901.)

Benjamin addressed breakfast gatherings in the homes of titled people and spoke for the mission at meetings throughout Britain. When the Cambridge Seven been accepted as missionary candidates, Broomhall organized large farewell gatherings in many centers and produced a book about the men, "A Missionary Band" (1876). A copy was accepted by Queen Victoria and some 20 thousand copies were sold.

For a while, Benjamin was Secretary of the Anti-slavery Association, one of many British anti-slavery societies formed during the mid-nineteenth century. His later interest in introducing Christianity into China, led to familiarity with Chinese slavery and opium addiction. Long opposed to the former, he also became an active opponent of the Opium trade, writing two books to promote the banning of opium smoking: “Truth about Opium Smoking” and “The Chinese Opium Smoker”. In 1888 Broomhall formed and became Secretary of the Christian Union for the Severance of the British Empire with the Opium Traffic and editor of its periodical, "National Righteousness". He lobbied the British Parliament to stop the opium trade. He and James Laidlaw Maxwell appealed to the London Missionary Conference of 1888 and the Edinburgh Missionary Conference of 1910 to condemn the continuation of the trade. When Broomhall was dying, his son Marshall read to him from The Times the welcome news that an agreement had been signed ensuring the end of the opium trade within two years. Benjamin and Amelia Broomhall were buried in London in the Abney Park Cemetery.

Further reading 
Historical Bibliography of the China Inland Mission

External links 
Christian Biography Resources
OMF International (formerly China Inland Mission and Overseas Missionary Fellowship)
Genealogy.com

1829 births
1911 deaths
People from the Borough of Stafford
Burials at Abney Park Cemetery
Leaders of Christian parachurch organizations
English Baptist missionaries
Baptist missionaries in China
British expatriates in China
19th-century Baptists